Hard Rain is a 1998 disaster heist action thriller film directed by former cinematographer-turned director Mikael Salomon, written by Graham Yost, produced by Ian Bryce, Mark Gordon, and Gary Levinsohn, and starring Morgan Freeman, Christian Slater, Randy Quaid, Minnie Driver, and Ed Asner. An international co-production among the United States, the United Kingdom, Denmark, Germany, and Japan, the plot centers around a heist and man-made treachery amidst a natural disaster in a small Indiana town.

Plot 
During a heavy rainstorm, Tom and his uncle Charlie, two armored truck drivers, are collecting money from banks in the town of Huntingburg, Indiana, which has been evacuated due to flooding. They are ambushed by Jim and his gang of armed robbers, Kenny, Mr. Mehlor, and Ray. Charlie calls the National Guard and is shot dead by Kenny as Tom escapes and hides the cash in a cemetery.

The gang chases Tom, who takes refuge in a nearby church. There he is mistaken for a looter by Karen who knocks him out. Tom wakes up in a cell and tells Sheriff Mike Collig about the gang and the money. Sheriff Collig and Chief Deputy Wayne Bryce leave him locked up and investigate, whilst Deputy Phil is ordered to take Karen out of town. Karen pushes Phil out of the boat to return to protect the church, which she is restoring.

The town's dam operator Hank is forced to open a spillway, causing a large wave and deeper flooding. Tom is trapped in his cell as the water rises. After protecting the church, Karen rescues him and they hide from the gang. Kenny is electrocuted. They enter a house and are mistaken for looters by the elderly residents Doreen and Henry Sears, who have refused to evacuate and are protecting their property. Henry is persuaded to give Tom their boat to return to the armored truck. Resurfacing from the submerged truck, he finds the gang holding the elderly couple hostage. Tom says he will tell them where the money is.

Jim reveals to Tom that Uncle Charlie was in cahoots with the gang, and did not actually call the National Guard; he was only killed because Kenny was not told Uncle Charlie was on their side. Tom finds the money has disappeared. They are ambushed by Sheriff Collig and his deputies plus Hank, who have found Karen and intend to keep the money for themselves.

Mr. Mehlor and Ray are killed in the shootout, and Jim and Tom escape and hide in the church. Wayne takes Karen to her house intending to rape her. The others gasoline-bomb the church and drive their boats through the stained glass windows. Karen stabs and kills Wayne. Hank shoots Phil for not shooting Tom when he had the chance.

The dam overtop alarm sounds. Collig suggests Tom and Jim should let Hank and him go with a couple of the bags of money. Tom agrees, but Jim does not. Tom leaves to try to save Karen, before Collig shoots Jim with a revolver he was hiding, although Jim isn't badly hurt. Collig and Hank escape in a boat. Hank is pushed out by Collig and is killed in a gas explosion.

Tom finds Karen handcuffed to a banister. He frees her and they climb to the roof to avoid the water where they are caught by Collig. Jim comes from behind them in a boat. Collig shoots at him, disabling the steering, forcing him to go over the roof. As he does so, the engine breaks off and collides with the sheriff, knocking him into the water. Collig tries to shoot Karen as he grabs a bag of money, but Tom and Jim shoot the corrupt sheriff dead. Tom tells Jim he should leave, just as the Indiana State Police arrive. Jim picks up Collig's bag of money and rows away, as Tom tells Karen the fire damage to her church was not too bad and can be repaired.

Cast

Production

Development 
The production of the film was a collaborative effort among numerous film studios, one of which was the British Broadcasting Corporation. Christian Slater himself served as co-producer. At one point, John Woo was attached to direct the film, but he left the project to direct Face/Off instead and the project was taken over by Mikael Salomon.

The film was originally titled The Flood, but it was changed because the film-makers did not want audiences to assume it was primarily a disaster film and not a heist-thriller. A massive, deadly flood the previous year from the Ohio River that caused millions in damages was still fresh in the minds of moviegoers also prompted the name change. However, the film still retained that title in numerous other countries.

The film was shot in Huntingburg, Indiana, where the film is set (in reality there is no major river or dam nearby, although there are two reservoirs near the town), as well as a $6 million set in an aircraft hangar in Palmdale, California where the B-1 Lancer bomber was manufactured, and some exteriors in Etobicoke, Toronto, Canada.

As of April 2016, upon speaking with the Huntingburg City Office, film historian Adam Nichols was informed of and shown a museum located upstairs in the city office where several props, costumes, media, and production stills are displayed featuring this film and the 1992 film A League of Their Own that was also partially filmed in Huntingburg.

About the ending, Morgan Freeman said: "I played a bad guy in a movie [Hard Rain] and they showed it to an audience – and we're letting an audience tell us what to do now – y'know, and the audience said, 'Well, I don't want him – Morgan can't die!' And I was a thief. 'He should get some money'. We went back into the studio and re-shot it so that I didn't die and I did get some money."

Release

Box office 
Hard Rain opened on the Martin Luther King long weekend in 1998 earning fifth place with $7.1 million from Friday to Sunday and $8 million including the holiday Monday. In the end, the film made $19.9 million in the US on a $70 million budget.

Due to its poor box office performance in the US, the film was released straight to video in most countries. In the UK, a 2004 showing on BBC One was very well received. The film gained a significant following in the video rental market.

Critical response 
Hard Rain received polarized reviews, some very positive and some very negative. A positive review was on timeout.com favorably compared the plot of Hard Rain to writer Graham Yost's earlier and more financially successful project, Speed, and suggested that it could be considered a spiritual sequel to Speed. Another review, on starpulse.com, praised the action scenes of Hard Rain yet criticized the plot, calling it "mindless" yet "entertaining". One particularly negative review came from Roger Ebert of the Chicago Sun-Times, who gave the film one star out of a possible four and stated: "Hard Rain is one of those movies that never convince you its stories are really happening. From beginning to end, I was acutely aware of actors being paid to stand in cold water. Suspension of my disbelief in this case would have required psychotropic medications." Although he criticised the plot and some of the casting, he did praise the special effects. On the TV show Siskel & Ebert & the Movies, he and his colleague Gene Siskel gave the film "two thumbs down". Commenting on its commercial performance, Total Film called it the "biggest flop of 1998" but said it deserved to perform better because of its "fun tension-cranking moments". Christopher Young's score was praised.

On Rotten Tomatoes it has a 32% approval rating based on 44 reviews. The site's consensus states: "Hard Rain is an implausible heist movie soaked in disaster movie trappings." Audiences polled by CinemaScore gave the film an average grade of "B−" on an A+ to F scale.

References

External links 
 
 
 
 Movie stills

1998 films
1998 action thriller films
1998 crime thriller films
1990s disaster films
1990s heist films
American action thriller films
American crime thriller films
American disaster films
American heist films
British action thriller films
British crime thriller films
British disaster films
British heist films
Danish crime thriller films
Dubois County, Indiana
English-language German films
English-language Japanese films
English-language Danish films
Films directed by Mikael Salomon
Films scored by Christopher Young
Films set in Indiana
Films set in Southwestern Indiana
Films shot in Indiana
Flood films
German action thriller films
German crime thriller films
German disaster films
German heist films
Japanese action thriller films
Japanese crime thriller films
Japanese disaster films
Japanese heist films
Mutual Film Company films
Paramount Pictures films
PolyGram Filmed Entertainment films
Films produced by Ian Bryce
1990s English-language films
1990s American films
1990s British films
1990s Japanese films
1990s German films